Stanley T. Tomlinson (July 9, 1903 - April 9, 1990) served in the California State Assembly for the 37th and 36th from 1949 to 1955. During World War II he also served in the United States Navy.

References

United States Navy personnel of World War I
1903 births
1990 deaths
20th-century American politicians
Republican Party members of the California State Assembly